Checkout, also known as Cash Register, is an Israeli mockumentary-style sitcom that premiered on 21 February 2018.

The show takes place in the Yavne branch of the fictional Israeli supermarket "Shefa Isaschar" and follows the routine interactions between the store's workers and customers.

Originally produced for the Israeli Educational Television channel, the show was later acquired by Kan 11 and renewed several times, with the fourth season set to begin on 26 April 2023.

Series summary

Season 1 
The first season began airing on 21 February 2018 on the Israeli Educational Television and continued until the closure of the channel, and was also broadcast by Channel 10. After the Educational Channel's closure, Kan 11 acquired the rights to the show and, starting on 31 August 2018, began airing reruns of the show before renewing it for a second season on 12 February 2019. The season ran for 20 episodes, plus one behind the scenes episode.

Season 2 
The second season began on 3 January 2020 on Kan 11 and ran through May of that year. In addition to broadcasts on television, it was also streamed on the Kan 11 YouTube channel.

Season 3 
The third season began on 26 July 2021 and ran through November of that year. In addition to broadcasts on television, it was also streamed on the Kan 11 YouTube channel.

Season 4 
In October 2021, it was announced that the series would be renewed for a fourth season, to begin broadcasting on 26 April 2023.

Reception 
The show received strongly positive reviews, praising the quality of the comedy as well as the show's portrayal of "social commentary...rooted in the unglamorous realities of Israeli culture."

The show has been popular with all ages, initially airing on the family-friendly Educational Channel but also reportedly one of the most watched TV series on Kan 11.

Awards 
The series has been nominated for several awards, both at home in Israel and abroad. The show was nominated for 10 awards at the Israeli Television Academy Awards in 2020, taking home the prize for Best Sitcom Series, and in 2021, the show was nominated for 13 awards, again winning Best Sitcom Series as well as Best Lead Actor in a Comedy Series (for Amir Shurush) and Best Supporting Actor in a Comedy Series (for Dov Navon).

The series was also one of the nominees for Best Comedy Series at the International Emmy Awards in 2019.

References

External links 
 

2010s Israeli television series debuts
Israeli comedy television series
Israeli Educational Television
Israeli television sitcoms
Kan 11 original programming
Mockumentary television series